The following lists events that happened during 1869 in Liberia.

Incumbents
President: James Spriggs Payne
Vice President: Joseph Gibson
Chief Justice: C. L. Parsons

Events

May
 May 4 – Liberian term of office referendum, 1869

Full date unknown
 Arthington is settled.
 The True Whig Party is founded in Clay-Ashland.

Births
 December 6 – Momulu Massaquoi, Vai monarch and Liberian diplomat, in Jabacca, Grand Cape Mount County (d. 1938)

References

 
Years of the 19th century in Liberia
Liberia
Liberia